May Smith may refer to:
 May Smith (textile designer) (1906–1988), painter, engraver, textile designer and textile printer
 May Smith (psychologist) (1879–1968), British psychologist
 Lady May Abel Smith (1906–1994), great-granddaughter of Queen Victoria
May Smith, character in Almost a Rescue